Arham Khussyairi bin Ab Wahab (born 26 January 2001) is a Malaysian professional footballer who plays for Malaysia Super League club Kuching City as a midfielder.

Club career

UiTM

Arham started his career with UiTM FC. While playing for UiTM FC, Arham has played in games as their captain.

Kuching City
On 8 January 2023, Arham signed a contract with Malaysia Super League club Kuching City. On 26 February 2023, Arham made his debut for the club in 2–1 win over Kelantan.

International career

Arham has expressed interest in representing the Malaysia national football team.

Style of play

Arham can operate as a defender or midfielder and is known for his ability to make overlaps.

References

External links
 

2001 births
Living people
Malaysian footballers
Malaysian people of Malay descent
Malaysia Premier League players
Malaysia Super League players
Kuching City F.C. players
Association football midfielders
UiTM FC players